Kolkhozny is a rural locality (a khutor) in Sergiyevskoye Rural Settlement of Giaginsky District, Adygea, Russia. The population was 77 as of 2018. There are 2 streets.

Geography 
The khutor is located on the left bank of the Gachucha River, 42 km southeast of Giaginskaya (the district's administrative centre) by road. Dneprovsky is the nearest rural locality.

Ethnicity 
The khutor is inhabited by Russians.

References 

Rural localities in Giaginsky District